Emmanuel Gyabuaa (born 21 September 2001) is an Italian professional footballer who plays as a midfielder for  club Pescara on loan from Atalanta.

Club career 
A youth product of Parma, the club declared bankruptcy in 2015 and Gyabuaa joined the youth academy of Atalanta. He made his professional debut with Atalanta as a substitute a 3–0 Serie A win over Fiorentina on 13 December 2020. In July 2021, Gyabuaa joined Serie B club Perugia on a one-year dry loan.

In July 2022, Gyabuaa joined Serie C club Pescara on a one-year loan.

International career 
Born in Italy, Gyabuaa is of Ghanaian descent. He is a youth international for Italy.

References

External links
 
 
 FIGC U15 Profile
 FIGC U16 Profile
 FIGC U17 Profile
 FIGC U18 Profile
 FIGC U19 Profile

2001 births
Living people
Italian people of Ghanaian descent
Sportspeople from Parma
Italian sportspeople of African descent
Italian footballers
Footballers from Emilia-Romagna
Association football midfielders
Italy youth international footballers
Serie A players
Serie B players
Atalanta B.C. players
A.C. Perugia Calcio players
Delfino Pescara 1936 players